Ceratotheca sesamoides is a flowering plant in the genus Ceratotheca. It is indigenous to Africa and grows both as a wild weed and locally cultivated species, and is colloquially referred to as false sesame owing to its marked similarities with common sesame (Sesamum indicum). The plant is most commonly cultivated in the African Savannah and other semi-arid areas on the continent   and is found across Africa in both tropic and sub-tropic regions, usually growing in sandier soils south of the Sahara. It can be identified by numerous hairs on the stem, its pink flowers often replete with brown and purple dots and a sub-erect growth habit.  A plant with many practical uses, the leaves and flowers are often consumed as vegetables or used in sauces. The leaves can also have medicinal benefits while the seeds can be employed to produce cooking oil. Despite its many uses and growing domestication at a local level, the plant remains predominantly underused and undervalued.

Description and geography

A member of the family Pedaliaceae, it is an annually flowering plant usually growing to around 60 cm but has been known to reach upwards of 100 cm. It is a slim upright herb with green leaves and pink, mauve or lilac flowers. The fruit produced by the plant is similar to that of Sesamum and is found in the form of a laterally flattened capsule with slender horns.   These horns distinguish it from Sesamum that lacks such a feature. False sesame is a dicot native to northern parts of West Africa but has spread across the continent from Senegal to Tanzania and the Democratic Republic of the Congo and southwards to Botswana and Mozambique.

Growth and ecology

False sesame stems are often prostrate and typically produce ten or more creeping stems. The frequent removal of younger shoots allows for protracted vegetative growth and flowering which extends the productive period. C. sesamoides is a primarily self-pollinating plant with the flowers opening at dawn. When the pollination process is complete it takes about six weeks from anthesis to full fruit maturity.  The seed is propagated through the onset of rains. Like other members of the plant family Pedaliaceae, false sesame is covered in mucilage glands which can enable the plant to survive dehydration without tissue death, making the plant drought resistant.  False sesame is very flexible with regards to environment and growing conditions occurring as a weed and in cultivated fields, growing best in well-drained sandy soils with high exposure to the sun but with less success in rocky areas.

Agriculture

Despite its wild heritage false sesame is relatively easy to cultivate. Its rugged nature means that it requires little upkeep and maintenance apart from some minimal weeding.  Its environmental flexibility allows for intercropping with a range of other plants such as eggplant, cowpea, amaranth, sorghum, sweet potato and sesame.  False sesame does not show dormancy and is relatively pest resistant, often having to contend with mostly minor pests. In Burkina Faso, it is recorded as one of the most disease- and pest-tolerant vegetables. For future reference, a collection of Ceratotheca sesamoides from western Sudan is available at the Agricultural Research Corporation in Wad Medani, Sudan.

Practical uses
Ceratotheca sesamoides is a plant with many uses and applications. When cooked directly in soups the mucilage containing leaves help to minimize nutrient loss. Leaves are finely chopped and can be used in a variety of different sauces, a common example being a mixture of chopped leaves, groundnut flour, salt, onions, tomatoes and a small amount of hot water often eaten with porridge. Ash is often used to lessen the impact of the bitter taste of the leaves. The seeds can be ground up into a fine paste and mixed with common crops like beans and cassava. Seeds can also be crushed to extract oil virtually identical to sesame oil that can be used with salads or in cooking. Adding the sap of false sesame leaves to the boiling seed pulp of Vitellaria paradoxa during the making of shea butter assists in the separation of fat.  The leaves can also be used as a source of livestock feed. It is claimed that false sesame also has a range of medical benefits and is used by local peoples to treat a range of diseases common on the African continent. Aqueous leaf extracts are used in the treatment of diarrhea, due to the alkaloids, phenolics, flavonoids and saponins found in the extract. Warm leaves can be ground up and mixed with ash then applied to inflamed cervical lymph nodes to help expedite delivery in both humans and animals.  If the leaves are ground up with the rhizome of Anchomanes difformis the ensuing mixture has been used to treat cases of leprosy.

References

Bibliography
Bedigian, D. & Adetula, O.A., 2004. Ceratotheca sesamoides Endl. In: Grubben, G.J.H. & Denton, O.A. (Editors). PROTA 2: Vegetables/Légumes. [CD-Rom]. PROTA, Wageningen, Netherlands.
Ceratotheca Sesamoides. (2012). Flora of Mozambique. Retrieved from Flora of Mozambique: Species information: Ceratotheca sesamoides.
Fasakin, K. (December 2004). Proximate* composition of bungu (Ceratotheca sesamoides Endl.) leaves and seeds. Biokemistri. 16(2), 88-92.
Falusi, O.A, Funmi, F.M, Salako, E.A. (2002). Inheritance of Hairiness of Stem and Petiole in a Selection from Local (Nigeria) Germoplasm of Sesame. Tropicultura. 20, 3, 156-158.
Toyin, Y.M, Khadijat, O.F, Saoban, S.S, Olakunle, A.T, Abraham, B.F, Luqman, Q.A. (2012). Antidiarrheal activity of aqueous leaf extract of Ceratotheca sesamoides in rats. Bangladesh Journal of Pharmacology. Vol. 7 Issue 1, 14-20.

External links
 

Leaf vegetables
Oil seeds
Crops originating from Africa
Flora of West Tropical Africa
Pedaliaceae
Plants described in 1832